The Samara culture was an Eneolithic (Copper Age) culture that flourished around the turn of the 5th millennium BCE, at the Samara Bend of the Volga River (modern Russia). The Samara culture is regarded as related to contemporaneous or subsequent prehistoric cultures of the Pontic–Caspian steppe, such as the Khvalynsk, Repin and Yamna (or Yamnaya) cultures. The Proto-Indo-European homeland is often linked to one or more of these cultures.

Place and time 
The Samara culture was an Eneolithic culture of the early 5th millennium BCE at the Samara bend region of the middle Volga, at the northern edge of the steppe zone. It was discovered during archaeological excavations in 1973 near the village of Syezzheye (Съезжее) near Bogatoye. Related sites are Varfolomeyevka on the Russian-Kazakh border (5500 BCE), which has parallels in Dzhangar (Kalmykia), and Mykol'ske, on the Dnieper. The later stages of the Samara culture are contemporaneous with its successor culture in the region, the early Khvalynsk culture (4700–3800 BCE), while the archaeological findings seem related to those of the Dniepr-Donets II culture (5200/5000–4400/4200 BCE).

The valley of the Samara river contains sites from earlier cultures as well (including the Elshanka culture), which are descriptively termed "Samara cultures" or "Samara valley cultures". Some of these sites are currently under excavation. "The Samara culture" as a proper name, however, is reserved for the early eneolithic of the region.

Artifacts

Pottery
Pottery consists mainly of egg-shaped beakers with pronounced rims. They were not able to stand on a flat surface, suggesting that some method of supporting or carrying must have been in use, perhaps basketry or slings, for which the rims would have been a useful point of support. The carrier slung the pots over the shoulder or onto an animal.
Decoration consists of circumferential motifs: lines, bands, zig-zags or wavy lines, incised, stabbed or impressed with a comb. These patterns are best understood when seen from the top. They appear then to be a solar motif, with the mouth of the pot as the sun. Later developments of this theme show that in fact the sun is being represented.

Sacrificial objects
The culture is characterized by the remains of animal sacrifice, which occur over most of the sites. There is no indisputable evidence of riding, but there were horse burials, the earliest in the Old World. Typically the head and hooves of cattle, sheep, and horses are placed in shallow bowls over the human grave, smothered with ochre. Some have seen the beginning of the horse sacrifice in these remains, but this interpretation has not been more definitely substantiated. We know that the Indo-Europeans sacrificed both animals and people, like many other cultures.

Graves
 
The graves found are shallow pits for single individuals, but two or three individuals might be placed there.

Some of the graves are covered with a stone cairn or a low earthen mound, the very first predecessor of the kurgan. The later, fully developed kurgan was a hill on which the deceased chief might ascend to the sky god, but whether these early mounds had that significance is doubtful.

Grave offerings included ornaments depicting horses. The graves also had an overburden of horse remains; it cannot yet be determined decisively if these horses were domesticated and ridden or not, but they were certainly used as a meat-animal. Most controversial are bone plaques of horses or double oxen heads, which were pierced.

The graves yield well-made daggers of flint and bone, placed at the arm or head of the deceased, one in the grave of a small boy. Weapons in the graves of children are common later. Other weapons are bone spearheads and flint arrowheads.

Other carved bone figurines and pendants were found in the graves.

Middle Volga culture 
The Samara culture was preceded by the Middle Volga culture that flourished in the 6th millennium BCE.

Genetics 

A male buried at Lebyazhinka, radiocarbon dated to 5640-5555 calBCE, and often referred to by scholars of archaeogenetics as the "Samara hunter-gatherer" (a.k.a. I0124; SVP44; M340431), appears to have carried the rare Y-DNA haplogroup R1b1* (R-L278*). This individual is ancestral for both haplogroup R1b1a1 and R1b1a2 and is therefore basal to both the predominantly western Eurasian R-M269 lineage and the mainly non-European R-M73/M478 lineage.

Mathieson et al. (2015, 2018) found that a male hunter-gatherer from Lebyazhinka, Samara Oblast who lived ca. 5650-5540 BCE belonged to Y-haplogroup R1b1a1a and mitochondrial haplogroup U5a1d.

Notes

References

Sources

 
 Marija Gimbutas, "The Civilization of the Goddess", HarperSanFrancisco, 1991,  or 
 J. P. Mallory, "Samara Culture", Encyclopedia of Indo-European Culture, Fitzroy Dearborn, 1997.

External links
 
 The Horse in Mortuary Symbolism...
 Mitochondrial DNA and the origins of the domestic horse
 Widespread Origins of Domestic Horse Lineages
 Factual archaeological description of Samara culture (in Russian)

Archaeological cultures of Eastern Europe
Chalcolithic cultures of Europe
Archaeological cultures in Russia
Indo-European archaeological cultures
Samara, Russia
5th millennium BC
6th millennium BC
Prehistoric Russia